USS Hawaii may refer to:

 , the third , was launched, but never commissioned
 , the third , was commissioned 5 May 2007

United States Navy ship names